The Europe/Africa Zone was one of the three regional zones of the 2018 Davis Cup.

In the Europe/Africa Zone there were three different tiers, called groups, in which teams competed against each other to advance to the upper tier. Winners in Group I advanced to the World Group Play-offs, along with losing teams from the World Group first round. Teams who lost their respective ties competed in the relegation play-offs, with winning teams remaining in Group I, whereas teams who lost their play-offs were relegated to the Europe/Africa Zone Group II in 2019.

Participating nations
Seeds: 
All seeds and  received a bye into the second round.
 
 
 
  

Remaining nations:

 
 
 
 

 
 
 

Draw

 and  relegated to Group II in 2019.

First round

South Africa vs. Israel

Ukraine vs. Sweden

Austria vs. Belarus

Second round

Czech Republic vs. Israel

Sweden vs. Portugal

Slovakia vs. Bosnia and Herzegovina

Russia vs. Austria

First round play-offs

Ukraine vs. Portugal

Russia vs. Belarus

2nd round play-offs

Portugal vs. South Africa

Slovakia vs. Belarus

References

External links
Official Website

Europe/Africa Zone Group I
Davis Cup Europe/Africa Zone